"Co-Pilot" is a 2011 song by Canadian singer Kristina Maria featuring Laza Morgan in its original English version. The song appears in Kristina Maria's album Tell the World and the single is the third single taken from her album after "FML X2" and "Let's Play". The song was a success reaching #26 on Billboard's Canadian Hot 100.

Maria also recorded a bilingual English and French version of the song for the francophone markets in Canada and France, featuring the Canadian singer Corneille where Maria sings the English parts and Corneille the French parts. That version reached #47 on SNEP, the official French Singles Chart.

Charts
Kristina Maria / Laza Morgan version

Kristina Maria / Corneille version

Corneille version

References

2011 singles
Macaronic songs
Songs written by Julian Bunetta
Songs written by Kristian Lundin
2011 songs